Top Volley Latina is a professional volleyball team based in Latina, Italy. The club plays in Serie A1 of the Italian Volleyball League.

Achievements
 CEV Cup
  2013
 CEV Challenge Cup
  2014
 Italian Championship Serie A2
  2009

Team
Team roster – season 2022/2023

References

External links
 Official website
 Team profile at Volleybox.net

Italian volleyball clubs
Latina, Lazio